The chief secretary to the Treasury is a ministerial office in the government of the United Kingdom who ranks as the second highest in the Treasury, after the chancellor of the Exchequer. The office was created in 1961, to share the burden of representing the Treasury with the chancellor.

The minister is shadowed by the shadow chief secretary to the Treasury who sits on the Official Opposition frontbench.

History and responsibilities
Between 1961 and 2015, the holder of the office of Chief Secretary to the Treasury was of full cabinet rank. This formally made the HM Treasury the only department to have more than one ministerial position of cabinet rank. Since 2015, however, the status of the office has been reduced to "also attending Cabinet".

The office holder is responsible for public expenditure, including spending reviews.

List of chief secretaries to the Treasury

See also
 Secretary to the Treasury
 Financial Secretary to the Treasury
 Economic Secretary to the Treasury
 Exchequer Secretary to the Treasury
 Paymaster General

References

Ministerial offices in the United Kingdom
Finance ministers of the United Kingdom
1961 establishments in the United Kingdom
Lists of government ministers of the United Kingdom